Greyhawk can refer to:

Grey hawk, a smallish raptor found in open country and forest edges in the Americas.
Greyhawk, a campaign setting for the Dungeons & Dragons (D&D) roleplaying game.
Greyhawk, a supplementary rulebook for the original edition of the Dungeons & Dragons role-playing game. 
Castle Greyhawk, one of the original locations in the setting.
Free City of Greyhawk, the city from which the Greyhawk setting takes its name.
Greyhawk dragon, a type of fictional dragon from the Greyhawk campaign setting, also called "Steel dragons" in other D&D settings.
Greyhawk was the original name for the Troika-developed video game The Temple of Elemental Evil (computer game).